An organizational ombudsman is a designated neutral or impartial dispute resolution practitioner whose major function is to provide independent, impartial, confidential and informal assistance to managers and employees, clients and/or other stakeholders of a corporation, university, non-governmental organization, governmental agency or other entity.  As an independent and neutral employee, the organizational ombudsman ideally should have no other role or duties. This is in order to maintain independence and neutrality, and to prevent real or perceived conflicts of interest.

Using an alternative dispute resolution (ADR) sensibility, an organizational ombudsman provides options for people with concerns, including  whistleblowers, who seek to bring their concerns forward safely and effectively.  Additionally, an organizational ombudsman offers coaching on ethics and other management issues, provides mediation to facilitate conflict resolution, helps enable safe upward feedback, assists those who feel harassed and discriminated against. Overall, the organizational ombudsman helps employees and managers navigate bureaucracy and deal with concerns and complaints.

The concept has been widely implemented, and has been spread around the globe, with many  corporations, universities, government and non-government entities establishing organizational ombudsman programs. In recent years there has been much research about 
organizational ombuds, for example at <https://www.ombudsassociation.org/journal-of-the-ioa> and <https://mitmgmtfaculty.mit.edu/mrowe/the-organizational-ombuds-role/> and <A Practical Guide to Organizational Ombuds: How They Help People and Organizations, Charles L. Howard, ABA, 2022>

Origin 
The organizational ombudsman role has evolved from at least two sources:  a) an evolution from the concept of the 'classical' ombudsman and b) a spontaneous creation and re-invention – of the idea of an internal, neutral conflict resolver – often by senior managers who had never heard of the classical model.

Evolution from the classical model: the classical ombudsman appeared in Sweden in the early 19th century as an independent high-level public official responsible to the parliament or legislature and appointed by constitutional or legislative provisions to monitor the administrative activities of government. This model has been copied and also adapted in many ways in many countries and milieus.

The spontaneous creation model: the organizational ombudsman role has also been regularly "re-invented" by employers who did not know of the classical ombudsman but valued the importance of a senior manager who is a neutral, independent, confidential and informal problem-solver and systems change agent. Examples appeared in the 1920s in the US and probably appeared here and there in many cultures. In many organizations the organizational ombudsman is seen as part of a complaint system or link to a complaint system, but the office is intended to function, and to appear to function, independently from all regular line and staff managementand to report to the CEO or Board of Directors.

Impartial third party role

Currently, the role is considered by some as a hallmark of an ethical organization and a key component of an integrated dispute resolution system, or complaint system.   Sometimes referred to as the ultimate 'inside-outsider', an organizational Ombudsman adheres to professional standards strictly governing their confidentiality and neutrality.  By virtue of their protected and highly placed internal role (e.g., reporting to a board of directors rather than to line or staff management), they can be particularly effective at working long-term with management to help effect change in policies, procedures, systems or structures that are problematic for employees or inefficient for the organization.

Associations and professional standards

The International Ombudsman Institute supports ombudsmen institutions to cooperate.  The umbrella professional association for organizational ombudsmen is the International Ombudsman Association, which provides training and establishes standards of practice.

Other non-profit think tanks, such as the Institute for Collaborative Engagement, have strongly supported the work and growth of the profession, as has the American Bar Association, through its support of standards and guidelines to establish organizational ombudsman offices.

Specific examples
Universities appoint ombudsmen to handle student and staff complaints and grievances.

Corporations and businesses contract or hire an ombudsman to enable businesses and organizations to realize their goals.

Some practitioners are certified mediators from organizations such as The Center for Dispute Resolution. Other practitioners have received a masters or Ph.D. in programs such as Mediation and Conflict Studies.

In this case study involving a home services organization, the organization used an ombuds office for monitoring, reporting, conflict resolution and engagement. Team coaching tools were deployed as well. In a case study involving a manufacturing business, the role of the ombudsperson included mediation, coaching individuals within the team, coaching with leadership to discover overall goals, team diagnostic assessments, ongoing team coaching centered on organizational culture, communications, team agreements, etc., and finally, training in conflict awareness.

See also

 Complaint system

References

 Howard, Charles, The Organizational Ombudsman: Origins, Roles and Operations - A Legal Guide, (Chicago, IL, American Bar Association, Jan. 2010)
 Rowe, Mary, An Organizational Ombuds Office In a System for Dealing with Conflict and Learning from Conflict, or Conflict Management System in the Harvard Negotiations Law Journal, 2009, at https://web.archive.org/web/20110726152154/http://www.hnlr.org/?page_id=52.
 Rowe, Mary, "Options, Functions, and Skills: What the Organizational Ombudsperson Might Want to Know," Negotiation Journal, April 1995, Vol. 11, No. 2, pp. 103–114, also regularly reprinted by the International Ombudsman Association, 1995-
 Rowe, Mary, "What is it like to be an Organization Ombudsperson?"  Journal of the IRRA, Perspectives on Work, Vol. 1, no. 2, 1998.
 Rowe, Mary and Bendersky, Corinne, "Workplace Justice, Zero Tolerance and Zero Barriers: Getting People to Come Forward in Conflict Management Systems, "in Negotiations and Change, From the Workplace to Society, Thomas Kochan and Richard Locke (editors), Cornell University Press, 2002

External links
 ABANet.org - Section of Administrative Law and Regulatory Practice:  Ombuds
 www.ombudsassociation.org - International Ombudsman Association
 ombuds-blog.blogspot.com - Ombuds Blog (News and Information for Organizational Ombuds)
 European Ombudsman Institute European Ombudsman Institute
  - Bristol-Myers Squibb Ombudsman

Dispute resolution
Ombudsmen by type